Virgil City is an unincorporated community which straddles the border between Vernon and Cedar counties in Missouri, United States, south-southwest of El Dorado Springs and northeast of Montevallo.

History
Virgil City was platted in 1866, and named for Virgil W. Kimball, founder. A post office called Virgil City was established in 1868, and remained in operation until 1905.

Notable people
Virgil City has been the home of two members of the United States House of Representatives: Charles Germman Burton (a Republican) and Frank H. Lee (a Democrat). Virgil City was also the home of Orville D. Cochran, lawyer and a Democratic member of the Alaska Territorial Legislature.

Notes

Unincorporated communities in Vernon County, Missouri
Unincorporated communities in Missouri